Thomas G. Boyd (September 5, 1928 – July 27, 2015) was an American farmer and politician.

Born in Filer, Idaho, Boyd graduated from the Twin Falls High School in Twin Falls, Idaho and then received his bachelor's degree in business from University of Idaho. Boyd served in the United States Air Force and was stationed in California. Boyd and his family owned a farm in Genesee, Idaho. Boyd served on the Idaho Board of Education and the Genesee School Board. He also served on the Idaho Pea and Lentil Commission. Boyd served on the Idaho House of Representatives between 1977 and 1992 as a Republican and was speaker of the house. Boyd died at a hospital in Moscow, Idaho.

References

1928 births
2015 deaths
People from Latah County, Idaho
People from Twin Falls County, Idaho
University of Idaho alumni
Farmers from Idaho
School board members in Idaho
Speakers of the Idaho House of Representatives
Republican Party members of the Idaho House of Representatives
United States Air Force airmen
Military personnel from Idaho